Ex on the Beach: Peak of Love is the winter-themed fourth season of the American version of the reality television show Ex on the Beach. It premiered on MTV on December 5, 2019. It featured ten singles from various reality television shows living together in Queenstown, New Zealand with their ex-partners.

Cast

Cast duration

Table key
 = The cast member is featured in this episode
 = The cast member arrives on the peak
 = The cast member has an ex arrive on the peak
 = The cast member arrives on the peak and has an ex arrive during the same episode
 = The cast member leaves the peak
 = The cast member arrives on the peak and leaves during the same episode
 = The cast member does not feature in this episode

Notes

Episodes
{{Episode table |background=#00BB00 |overall=5 |season=5 |title=30 |airdate=25 |country=U.S. |viewers=10 |episodes=
{{Episode List
 |EpisodeNumber   = 40
 |EpisodeNumber2  = 1
 |Title           = Welcome to the Peak
 |OriginalAirDate = 
 |ShortSummary    = Ten singles arrive in New Zealand hoping to find their next love. Callum and Nicole find their potential next in Georgia and Allie respectively, but the arrival of the first two exes put a wrench in their plans. |Viewers         = 0.40
 |LineColor       = 00BB00
}}
{{Episode List
 |EpisodeNumber   = 41
 |EpisodeNumber2  = 2
 |Title           = Winter Un-Wonderland
 |OriginalAirDate = 
 |ShortSummary    = Adore gladly welcomes Jakk in the house, hoping to rekindle their relationship. La Demi opens up with Georgia and Adore, revealing that she is transgender and also that she is attracted to Marlon, but gets upset after seeing him flirting with others. |Viewers         = 0.33
 |LineColor       = 00BB00
}}
{{Episode List
 |EpisodeNumber   = 42
 |EpisodeNumber2  = 3
 |Title           = Caught Red Velvet Handed
 |OriginalAirDate = 
 |ShortSummary    = Laurel goes in the Sauna of Secrets with Nicole, where she gets confirmation about her past cheating and finds out that she kissed Allie behind her back. Hoping to move on with Georgia, Callum votes Megan out of the house. |Viewers         = 0.32
 |LineColor       = 00BB00
}}
{{Episode List
 |EpisodeNumber   = 43
 |EpisodeNumber2  = 4
 |Title           = De Niall is not Just an Ex
 |OriginalAirDate = 
 |ShortSummary    = La Demi welcomes Tyler, her ex that she knows since before transitioning. Georgia and Callum go on a date, but are interrupted by Niall, Georgia seems not completely over him; Allie and Tyranny like the newcomer as well. Jakk gets in Marlon's bed, upsetting Adore. |Viewers         = 0.28
 |LineColor       = 00BB00
}}
{{Episode List
 |EpisodeNumber   = 44
 |EpisodeNumber2  = 5
 |Title           = Boo Years Eve!
 |OriginalAirDate = 
 |ShortSummary    = Jemmye arrives at the chalet hoping to make things clear with Marlon, but with her phone cleared of any evidence. Meanwhile Niall chooses Allie over Tyranny, and Sydney realizes Daniel is not her next. Nicole votes out Laurel so that she can feel free to pursue other people. |Viewers         = 0.31
 |LineColor       = 00BB00
}}
{{Episode List
 |EpisodeNumber   = 45
 |EpisodeNumber2  = 6
 |Title           = The Bird Has Landed
 |OriginalAirDate = 
 |ShortSummary    = Now that Laurel is out, Nicole bonds with Sydney. Georgia is not happy to see her ex Sam in the chalet. La Demi starts flirting with the newcomer, but both Georgia and Callum think Sam is playing her in hopes of not being voted out. Niall takes Allie on a date, but she thinks he is too immature for her and it does not end well. |Viewers         = 0.39
 |LineColor       = 00BB00
}}
{{Episode List
 |EpisodeNumber   = 46
 |EpisodeNumber2  = 7
 |Title           = SOS, Save Our Singles
 |OriginalAirDate = 
 |ShortSummary    = Magdalena arrives on the peak, but Ryan doesn't fully trust her. Laurel comes back to announce her revenge: the power shifts and one of the singles is getting voted out. |Viewers         = 0.37
 |LineColor       = 00BB00
}}
{{Episode List
 |EpisodeNumber   = 47
 |EpisodeNumber2  = 8
 |Title           = Ex-cuzzi
 |OriginalAirDate = 
 |ShortSummary    = Carlos arrives on the peak for Allie, but Niall is annoyed by their connection. Sydney and Nicole go on a date together, unknowingly to them, Ashley listen to their whole conversation before surprising them in the jacuzzi. Marlon and La Demi finally share a kiss. |Viewers         = 0.37
 |LineColor       = 00BB00
}}
{{Episode List
 |EpisodeNumber   = 48
 |EpisodeNumber2  = 9
 |Title           = Mums the Word
 |OriginalAirDate = 
 |ShortSummary    = Nicole moves on from Sydney to Ashley, while Marlon welcomes Todd to the chalet and wants to pursue him instead of La Demi. Georgia and Callum make their relationship official after meeting each other's mom in the Sauna of Secrets. Adore is afraid her interest in Tyler could get in the way of her friendship with La Demi. |Viewers         = 0.30
 |LineColor       = 00BB00
}}
{{Episode List
 |EpisodeNumber   = 49
 |EpisodeNumber2  = 10
 |Title           = Don't Say Soulmate
 |OriginalAirDate = 
 |ShortSummary    = Another ex of Callum's arrives and Georgia is frustrated about it. Jemmye makes sure Sam gets to go on a date but only if he agrees to take Paris with him instead of Tyranny. Her plan works and Tyranny is not happy about it. |Viewers         = 0.35
 |LineColor       = 00BB00
}}
{{Episode List
 |EpisodeNumber   = 50
 |EpisodeNumber2  = 11
 |Title           = Adore-able Mess
 |OriginalAirDate = 
 |ShortSummary    = Tyranny's ex arrives and they try to rekindle their relationship. Adore tries to figure out if Tyler could be her next, but Trenton shows up looking for answers, while La Demi wants Tyler to leave the peak because she does not want to lose him as a friend, but Callum and Georgia thinks she is too hard on him. In the end, Allie votes Carlos out in hopes of moving on with Niall. |Viewers         = 0.38
 |LineColor       = 00BB00
}}

}}

References

External links
 Official website

2019 American television seasons
2020 American television seasons
Ex on the Beach